Liberty and Justice For... is the third full-length studio album from New York hardcore band Agnostic Front. It was released in 1987 on Relativity/Combat Records and follows 1986's Cause for Alarm. Live at CBGB followed this album in 1989 featuring songs from the band's first three albums and EP.

The band further explored the crossover direction they had begun on their previous album, whilst still keeping the songs to the bare minimum duration-wise. Almost wholesale changes in line-up had taken place since the previous album with the rhythm section and second guitar slot all seeing new players.

Track listing

Personnel
Agnostic Front
 Roger Miret – vocals
 Vinnie Stigma – lead guitar
 Steve Martin – rhythm guitar
 Alan Peters – bass
 Will Shepler – drums
Production
 Produced by Norman Dunn
 Engineered by Alex Perialas

Trivia
 The album was engineered by Alex Perialas who was quite well known at the time for his work on thrash metal recordings.
 The album was referenced in "Denver Haircut" by The Hold Steady off their record Thrashing Thru the Passion.

External links
Flex! Discography album entry
Discogs album entry
Agnostic Front official website

1987 albums
Agnostic Front albums
Combat Records albums